Blue Öyster Cult is an American hard rock band from Long Island, New York. Formed in 1967, the group originally consisted of guitarist and vocalist Donald "Buck Dharma" Roeser, bassist Andrew Winters, drummer Albert Bouchard, keyboardist and later rhythm guitarist and backing vocalist Allen Lanier, and rhythm guitarist John Wiesenthal. The band has been through many lineup changes, and currently includes Roeser, vocalist and guitarist Eric Bloom (since 1969), bassist and backing vocalist Danny Miranda (from 1995 to 2004, in 2007, and since 2017), rhythm guitarist, keyboardist and vocalist Richie Castellano, and drummer Jules Radino (both since 2004).

History

1967–1986
Blue Öyster Cult was formed in 1967 as Soft White Underbelly, under the guidance of manager Sandy Pearlman and writer Richard Meltzer. The original lineup of the group included guitarist and vocalist Donald "Buck Dharma" Roeser, keyboardist Allen Lanier, rhythm guitarist John Wiesenthal, bassist and backing vocalist Andrew Winters, and drummer and backing vocalist Albert Bouchard. After several short-lived line-ups, Les Braunstein was brought in later as the band's first lead vocalist. Braunstein was replaced by Eric Bloom in mid-1969, during which time the band changed name twice – first to Oaxaca and later to Stalk-Forrest Group. Winters was replaced in the summer of 1970 by Albert's brother Joe Bouchard, and the following year the group settled on the name Blue Öyster Cult.

The lineup of Blue Öyster Cult remained stable for over ten years, during which time the band released its most commercially successful material. However, in August 1981 Albert Bouchard was fired after a show for turning up late on several recent occasions. He was replaced by Rick Downey, who had been working as the band's crew chief and lighting designer. Downey remained with the group until January 1985, after which Bouchard returned for a short run of shows in February before Jimmy Wilcox joined in April. Lanier was also replaced by Tommy Zvoncheck at around the same time. Joe Bouchard left the following year after playing his last show in February, with Jon Rogers taking his place. After touring until September, Blue Öyster Cult began a temporary hiatus which would ultimately last less than a year.

1987 onwards
Upon receiving an offer to tour in Greece, Blue Öyster Cult reformed in 1987 with returning keyboardist Lanier and new drummer Ron Riddle. The band's next studio album, Imaginos, was originally recorded as an Albert Bouchard solo album, but was later reworked and released by the band. Riddle left in May 1991 and was replaced the following month by Chuck Burgi. John Miceli briefly substituted for Burgi in May 1992, and in September 1995 the drummer left the band to join Rainbow. Rogers also left in April, with Greg Smith taking his place until Danny Miranda took over in August. John O'Reilly joined on drums in September, but would only remain until the following August when Burgi returned. Miceli returned for a string of shows in early 1997, before Bobby Rondinelli joined in February.

After contributing to three studio albums, Miranda and Rondinelli left Blue Öyster Cult in September 2004, the former joining Miceli in the band for the Las Vegas production of the We Will Rock You musical and the latter joining The Lizards full-time. Miranda was replaced by Richie Castellano, while Jules Radino took Rondinelli's place. Lanier played his last show as a member of Blue Öyster Cult in November 2006, retiring from all recording and touring shortly after. Castellano took over Lanier's role in the band, while bass was handled briefly by returning members Miranda followed by Rogers, before Rudy Sarzo joined in June. Sarzo remained until 2012, when he and the band decided to part ways. Kasim Sulton took Sarzo's place, remaining with the band until early 2017 when Miranda returned.

Members

Current

Former

Touring

Timeline

Lineups

Notes

References

External links
Blue Öyster Cult official website

Blue Öyster Cult